The Players Tour Championship 2012/2013 – Event 2 was a professional minor-ranking snooker tournament that took place between 8–12 August 2012 at the South West Snooker Academy in Gloucester, England.

Martin Gould won his first tournament carrying ranking points by defeating Stephen Maguire 4–3 in the final.

Prize fund and ranking points
The breakdown of prize money and ranking points of the event is shown below:

1 Only professional players can earn ranking points.

Main draw

Preliminary rounds

Round 1 
Best of 7 frames

Round 2 
Best of 7 frames

Main rounds

Top half

Section 1

Section 2

Section 3

Section 4

Bottom half

Section 5

Section 6

Section 7

Section 8

Finals

Century breaks 

 142, 118  Rod Lawler
 142  Neil Robertson
 141, 127  Alfie Burden
 140, 132  Fergal O'Brien
 140, 100  Judd Trump
 140  Martin O'Donnell
 140  Jamie Burnett
 139, 106  Marco Fu
 134, 113, 104  Martin Gould
 134  Xiao Guodong
 130, 116  Mark Williams
 130, 114  Liang Wenbo
 129, 123, 114  Stephen Maguire

 126, 121  Joe Perry
 126  Shaun Murphy
 122, 101  Mark King
 118  Paul Davison
 114  Tom Ford
 114  Simon Bedford
 109  Barry Hawkins
 108, 102  Mark Allen
 106  Kyren Wilson
 104  Jimmy Robertson
 104  Ben Woollaston
 103, 102  Peter Lines
 100  Robbie Williams

References 

2
2012 in English sport
August 2012 sports events in the United Kingdom